Kenneth L. Tallman (March 22, 1925 – March 6, 2006) was a United States Air Force lieutenant general. He was the eighth Superintendent of the United States Air Force Academy.

Biography

Tallman was born in 1925, in Omaha, Nebraska. He graduated from Cheyenne High School in Cheyenne, Wyoming in 1942, and enrolled at the University of Wyoming where he was a member of their NCAA basketball championship team in 1943.

Military service
He enrolled in the United States Military Academy, West Point, New York, graduating in 1946. He received a master's degree in international affairs from The George Washington University in 1967 and an honorary doctor of laws degree from the University of Wyoming in 1978.

Tallman earned his pilot wings in the United States Army Air Forces at Stewart Field, New York in 1946, and then served in a succession of fighter unit assignments, including aircraft carrier duty with the Navy.

In 1956, Tallman (USAF) became a training officer at the U.S. Air Force Academy, eventually assuming the duties of cadet group air officer commanding. AOCs assist and advise cadet commanders in the operation of their units.

Three years later he was transferred to Headquarters U.S. Air Forces in Europe as an operations staff officer. Returning from Europe in 1962, he entered the Marine Corps Senior Staff School, Quantico, Virginia, completing it a year later. He then had a series of operational duties in the United States until 1965 when he became executive assistant to the commander, Military Assistance Command, Vietnam, in Saigon.

He completed the National War College in 1967 and was assigned to Headquarters U.S. Air Force as assistant for colonel assignments under the Deputy Chief of Staff, Personnel. In 1970, he became commander, 836th Air Division, MacDill Air Force Base, Florida.

The next year, he was named deputy commander, Air Force Military Personnel Center, Randolph Air Force Base, Texas, and in 1972 assumed command of the center. In June 1973, he moved to Headquarters U.S. Air Force to serve as director of personnel plans, Office of the Deputy Chief of Staff, Personnel. He became deputy chief of staff, personnel, Headquarters U.S. Air Force in August 1975.

General Tallman became the eighth U.S. Air Force Academy Superintendent on June 27, 1977.

His military decorations include the  Air Force Distinguished Service Medal with oak leaf cluster, Legion of Merit with oak leaf cluster, Air Medal, Soldier's Medal, and Air Force Commendation Medal with two oak leaf clusters.

Tallman was promoted to lieutenant general September 1, 1975, with date of rank August 27, 1975. He retired July 1, 1981, later serving as President of Embry-Riddle Aeronautical University for five years. He died March 6, 2006, of complications of Alzheimer's disease and Parkinson's disease.

References

External links
"Former president Tallman dies at 80" The Avion, Embry-Riddle Aeronautical University.

United States Air Force generals
Superintendents of the United States Air Force Academy
United States Military Academy alumni
Elliott School of International Affairs alumni
Recipients of the Air Force Distinguished Service Medal
Recipients of the Legion of Merit
United States Air Force personnel of the Vietnam War
1925 births
2006 deaths
Military personnel from Omaha, Nebraska
Army Black Knights men's basketball players
Wyoming Cowboys basketball players
Wyoming Cowboys football players
Players of American football from Nebraska
Recipients of the Air Medal
Recipients of the Order of the Sword (United States)
Sportspeople from Omaha, Nebraska
American men's basketball players
Basketball players from Nebraska
Basketball players from Wyoming